Raymond Paul "Raymie" Stata is an American computer engineer and business executive.

Early life
Stata received his bachelor's and master's degrees in Computer Science and Engineering from MIT, where he also earned his Ph.D. in 1996, under adviser John Guttag.

Stata's father, Ray Stata, was founder and chairman of Analog Devices.

Career 
After finishing his Ph.D., Stata worked for Digital Equipment Corporation's Systems Research Center, where he contributed to the AltaVista search engine. He was an assistant professor of Computer Science at the Baskin School of Engineering at UC Santa Cruz, and collaborated with the Internet Archive.

In 2002, Stata founded Stata Laboratories. The company developed the Bloomba search-based e-mail client and the SAProxy anti-spam filter.

Stata Labs was acquired by Yahoo! in 2004, for an undisclosed amount. Stata continued working for Yahoo!, and in 2010, became the company's chief technology officer, a position he held until he left the company in 2012. With Yahoo!, Stata co-developed a composition model for cloud-hosted serving applications, for which he was granted a patent. Stata was also involved early in Apache Hadoop, consulting with and eventually hiring its founders Doug Cutting and Mike Cafarella at Yahoo!.

After leaving Yahoo! in 2012, Stata founded Altiscale, a company that provided Apache Hadoop-as-a-service marketed as "big data in the cloud". Altiscale was named a Cool Vendor in Big Data by Gartner for 2015. Stata served as Altiscale's CEO until 2016, when the company was acquired by the software company SAP for more than $125 million. Following SAP's acquisition, Stata became senior vice president of big data services for about a year.

Since 2018, Stata served as product and technology advisor for Aqfer, an enterprise software company developing data marketing tools. Stata also serves on the board for technology companies Vanu and Gamalon.

Stata is on the advisory council for QuakeFinder, a research and development group focusing on earthquake prediction. Until 2018, he served on the board of trustees for the Computer History Museum in Mountain View, California.

Publications

References

1968 births
American computer businesspeople
American technology chief executives
American computer scientists
Living people
MIT School of Engineering alumni
Businesspeople from Boston
University of California, Santa Cruz faculty
Yahoo! employees
American chief technology officers